The 2002 Rally New Zealand (formally the 33rd Propecia Rally New Zealand) was the twelfth round of the 2002 World Rally Championship. The race was held over three days between 4 October and 6 October 2002, and was won by Peugeot's Marcus Grönholm, his 11th win in the World Rally Championship.

Background

Entry list

Itinerary
All dates and times are NZST (UTC+12) from 4 to 5 October 2002 and NZDT (UTC+13) on 6 October 2002.

Results

Overall

World Rally Cars

Classification

Special stages

Championship standings
Bold text indicates 2002 World Champions.

Production World Rally Championship

Classification

Special stages

Championship standings

References

External links 
 Official website of the World Rally Championship

New Zealand
Rally New Zealand
Rally